Abraham Adelsberger (April 23, 1863 in Hockenheim – August 24, 1940 in Amsterdam) was a German toy factory owner, councilor of commerce and art collector.

Toy manufacturer 
Adelsberger settled in Nuremberg in 1897 with his wife  Clothilde née Reichhold (1872-1954), who came from Fürth. The couple had two children, Paul and Sofie. Adelsberger operated a shop until the 1930s. He created one of the first toy factories in the world, "Heinrich Fischer & Cie". The export-oriented company with about 300 employees mainly manufactured movable toys with flywheel or clockwork drive. In 1909, he was admitted to the Nuremberg Masonic Lodge Albrecht Dürer.

Art collector 

His thriving business enabled Adelsberger  to build a villa and to collect art, including porcelain and 19th century works as well as valuable paintings by Peter Paul Rubens, Gustav Schönleber, Georg Jakobides, Carl Spitzweg, Paul Weber. The painting "Jupiter and Antiope" by the Dutch painter Hendrick Goltzius was also in his collection.

The Great Depression brought financial difficulties. Adelsberger borrowed 600,000 Reichsmarks as early as 1927/28 putting up real estate and several artworks as collateral.

Nazi persecution 
When the Nazis came to power in Germany in 1933, Adelsbeger and his family were persecuted due to their Jewish heritage. 

His son Paul emigrated to America in 1934. His daughter Sofie fled to Amsterdam with her husband, Adelsberger and his wife remained in Nuremberg. 

In 1937, Adelsberger had to sell his house and other real estate; his toy factory was Aryanized.

In 1939 they fled to Amsterdam to join their daughter. Adelsberger carried a few works of art with him when he fled, including the painting by Goltzius. In August 1940, Abraham Adelsberger died in Amsterdam. In 1941, Hermann Göring took possession of the painting through a forced sale in order to decorate his country estate Carinhall with it. Adelsberger's wife was deported to the Bergen-Belsen concentration camp in 1943. She survived the Holocaust and applied for reparations after the Second World War, in which her husband's art collection played only a minor role. She did not get back the painting "Jupiter and Antiope"; it remained in the Netherlands. In 2009, it was returned to Adelsberger's heirs by the Dutch government, and in 2010 it was auctioned off by the Sotheby's auction house for $6.8 million.

Restitution of Nazi-looted art 
In 2020, the Bayerische Staatsgemäldesammlungen are restituting an oil painting by Joseph Wopfner, Fischerboote bei Frauenchiemsee (fig. 1), to the heirs of Adelsberger's son in law, Alfred Isay (1885-1948).

In 2019 the German Lost Art Foundation has approved a new research project at Freie Universität Berlin to research Adelsberger's art collection.

Literature 

 Die Geschichte der Adelsbergers. In Frank-Uwe Betz: Verfolgte, Widerständige, Ausgebeutete – über die Nazizeit in der Region Schwetzingen – Hockenheim.  HRSG. Arbeitskreis Freundliches Schwetzingen – Verein für regionale Zeitgeschichte e.V. Verlag Regionalkultur, Ubstadt-Weiher  2015, ISBN 978-3-89735-924-6. Text online hier.
 Manfred H. Grieb (Hrsg.): Nürnberger Künstlerlexikon: Bildende Künstler, Kunsthandwerker, Gelehrte, Sammler, Kulturschaffende und Mäzene vom 12. bis zur Mitte des 20. Jahrhunderts. Walter de Gruyter, Berlin 2007, ISBN 978-3-5981176-3-3.

External links 

 Birgit Ruf: Raubkunst aus Franken, Nürnberger Nachrichten, 27. Februar 2010
 Frank-Uwe Betz: Ein bekannter Hersteller von Blechspielzeug, Hockenheimer Tageszeitung, 25. Februar 2014.
 restitutiecommissie 9. März 2009
 Martin Thiele Freie Universitaet Berlin 5 June 2019 in Newsletter von Looted Art com: Raubkunst auf der Spur - On the trail of robbery. Am Kunsthistorischen Institut wird die Sammlung des Unternehmers Abraham Adelsberger erforscht und rekonstruiert. Ein Teil war während der Weltwirtschaftskrise an Banken verpfändet und im Nationalsozialismus aufgelöst worden.

References 

1863 births
1940 deaths
German Freemasons
German art collectors
Emigrants from Nazi Germany